Randy Neufeld (born May 26, 1962 in Boissevain, Manitoba) is a Canadian curler from La Salle, Manitoba.

In 2015, Neufeld and his rink of Dean Moxham, Peter Nicholls and Dale Michie won his first provincial title of any kind, when his team won the Manitoba senior men's championship. The team went on to win the 2015 Canadian Senior Curling Championships, after defeating Quebec's Ted Butler in the final. This qualified the team to represent Canada at the 2016 World Senior Curling Championships. There, Neufeld led Canada to an 8-0 round robin record, and went all the way to the final before losing to Sweden's Mats Wranå.

In 2016, Neufeld and his team won another provincial championships and would represent Manitoba at the 2016 Canadian Senior Curling Championships. The team almost defended their title, making it to the final again, but they would lose to Ontario's Bryan Cochrane.

He is currently the coach of the Jason Gunnlaugson curling team.

Personal life
He is married and has two children. He works as the Director of Operations at the Canadian Mennonite University.

References

External links
 

Living people
1962 births
Curlers from Manitoba
Canadian male curlers
Canadian curling coaches